Pryor Mountains National Forest was established as the Pryor Mountains Forest Reserve by the U.S. Forest Service in Montana on November 6, 1906 by the U.S. Forest Service with .  It became a National Forest on March 4, 1907. On July 1, 1908 it was combined with part of Yellowstone National Forest to establish Beartooth National Forest.  The name was discontinued.

The forest today comprises the Pryor Mountains unit of the Beartooth Ranger District of Custer National Forest, in Carbon County, Montana.

See also
 Pryor Mountains
 List of forests in Montana

References

External links
Beartooth Ranger District, Custer National Forest
Forest History Society
Listing of the National Forests of the United States and Their Dates (from the Forest History Society website) Text from Davis, Richard C., ed. Encyclopedia of American Forest and Conservation History. New York: Macmillan Publishing Company for the Forest History Society, 1983. Vol. II, pp. 743-788.
 Pryor Mountains Access Roads (map)

Former National Forests of Montana
Protected areas of Carbon County, Montana
1906 establishments in Montana
Protected areas established in 1906
Protected areas disestablished in 1908
1908 disestablishments in Montana